Bryan Baeumler (born 18 April 1974) is a Canadian television host on several HGTV/HGTV Canada shows. A former handyman and businessman, he translated those careers into a series of TV shows about home renovations in Canada and expanding to hotel renovations in the Bahamas. He has won a Gemini Award for his hosting and has published a book on home renovations.

Early life and education
Learning the trade from his father, an aircraft engineer, Baeumler spent his childhood summers constructing his family's cottage. At 14, Baeumler opened his own handyman business doing odd jobs for neighbors. He received his B.A. in Political Science and Business from the University of Western Ontario in 1996.

Business activity

Baeumler worked from 1995 to 2003 running an air-cargo business.

After working as a builder, he founded a construction company, which became Baeumler Quality Construction and Renovations Inc., of which he is president and CEO.

In 2011, Baeumler launched Baeumler Approved, a website that aids homeowners connect with home-service companies in Canada. Baeumler became the spokesperson of HeyBryan, a peer-to-peer mobile marketplace app that connects homeowners with home-service providers, in 2018.

In 2017 Bryan and his wife Sarah bought a defunct abandoned beachfront resort on South Andros, Bahamas, and renovated it into a new sustainable luxury resort, Caerula Mar Club, that opened in December 2019, that they own and operate. With the location in the Bahamas, the Baeumlers undertook actions for disaster relief in 2019 in the wake of Hurricane Dorian. Though the storm did not hit their resort, their employees were affected through friends and relations on the devastated islands further to the north.

Shows
Baeumler has been a host on several shows, including Disaster DIY, Disaster DIY: Cottage Edition, Leave It to Bryan, House of Bryan, Bryan Inc., and Island of Bryan.  He is also a judge on the HGTV show Canada's Handyman Challenge along with Mike Holmes and Scott McGillivray. With his wife, Sarah Baeumler, they co-lead in the Bryan Inc. show on HGTV Canada.

Disaster DIY

Disaster DIY is a show on HGTV Canada about "Do-It-Yourselfer"s who have failed at their own home renovations and are in desperate need of some on-the-job training. The show is hosted by Baeumler and directed by Craig Goodwill. The projects on the show take place within the Greater Toronto Area. The show ran from 2007 to 2011.

House of Bryan

House of Bryan is a series starring Baeumler's entire nuclear family, him, his wife, and their children; plus his apprentice, Adam. The series covers the construction of various homes that the Baeumlers live in, his dream home, country cottage, and forever home. It became the highest rated series ever on HGTV Canada in 2016. The show ran from 2010 to 2015.

Leave It to Bryan

Leave it to Bryan is a Canadian home renovation reality series hosted by Baeumler, which premiered in January 2012 on HGTV. The premise of the show is that the renovations most desired by a homeowner are not necessarily always the ones most urgently needed in the home. The show ran from 2012 to 2017, and was put on hiatus.

Bryan Inc. / Renovation Inc.

Bryan Inc. premiered on HGTV Canada in Fall 2016, replacing House of Bryan on the schedule. The show focuses on Baeumler pairing with his wife to buy properties, renovate or replace (new build) the houses, and then sell them at a profit. In the first season, they buy two properties, one selected by each of them, and then Baeumler's construction company crews rebuild the homes, which they then sell. The show ran from 2016 to 2018, and went on hiatus with the start of Island of Bryan. After the success of Renovation Island (Island of Bryan) on HGTV USA, Bryan Inc. was licensed as Renovation, Inc. for U.S. HGTV in 2020.

Island of Bryan / Renovation Island

Island of Bryan is a TV show that premiered on HGTV Canada on 7 April 2019. The show follows the Baeumler family as they renovate a neglected 50-year-old hotel in the Bahamas. Due to the remote location of the resort, supplies only came in weekly and did not always come every week. The family was also living in the resort while they were renovating it. The show first aired in 2019. HGTV U.S. repackaged the show in June 2020 as Renovation Island for American audiences.

Renovation Resort
Renovation Resort is a TV show set to premier on HGTV Canada in spring 2023. The show follows Scott McGillivray, who has purchased a lakeside resort. He enlists the help of Bryan Baeumler to help renovate the resort, similar to what the Baeumlers did on Island of Bryan / Renovation Island. The show will be a 7-episode competition series, featuring 4 teams of contractor-designer duos advised by McGillivray and Baeumler, who will renovate cabin-by-cabin competing head-to-head. The winning cabin will get the winning team the grand prize.

Guest appearances
Bryan has made several guest appearances. Bryan was a judge on Canada's Handyman Challenge. He was also a judge on Deck Wars. Bryan was a guest builder on Home to Win.

Awards
Baeumler won the Gemini Award for "Best Host in a Lifestyle/Practical Information, or Performing Arts Program or Series" in 2008 for his presenting work on Disaster DIY.

Personal life
Baeumler and his wife Sarah (26 March 1978) have four children: Quintyn Werner, Charlotte Anne, Lincoln Wolfgang, and Josephine Judith.

During the time that the Baeumlers were living at Caerula Mar Resort renovating it (as seen on Island of Bryan), the children were at first home schooled. Then Quintyn was sent to a regional boarding school high school for a normal high school life, while the other three children were enrolled in a nearby Bahamian school. The extensive renovations at the resort put stress on Bryan's marriage with Sarah.

Published works
 Baeumler, Bryan. (2015) Measure Twice: Tips and Tricks from the Pros to Help You Avoid the Most Common DIY Disasters. paperback, 328 pages; HarperCollins Publishers Ltd; .

See also 
 Paul LaFrance

Notes

References

External links

Official website
Hey Brian
Baeumler Construction

Living people
Appleby College alumni
Canadian television hosts
People from Oakville, Ontario
University of Western Ontario alumni
1974 births